The Gender Recognition Panel is a tribunal in the United Kingdom dealing with transsexual and transgender concerns and allowing people to change their legal gender. It was founded to satisfy the Gender Recognition Act 2004, which legislates its decision-making process.

It issues gender recognition certificates for people who "live in another gender".

The members of the panel are appointed by the Lord Chancellor  with the agreement of the presidents of the Courts for England and Wales, Scotland, and Northern Ireland. Only lawyers, medical practitioners or psychologists may be appointed to the panel. Its current president, Paula Gray, was appointed by Robert Buckland in 2019.

See also

 Transgender rights in the United Kingdom
 LGBT rights in the United Kingdom
 Legal aspects of transsexualism

References

External links

Website

United Kingdom tribunals
Transgender law in the United Kingdom
LGBT rights in the United Kingdom